Lepidophanes is a genus of lanternfishes found in the Atlantic Ocean.

Species
There are currently two recognized species in this genus:
 Lepidophanes gaussi (A. B. Brauer, 1906)
 Lepidophanes guentheri (Goode & T. H. Bean, 1896)

References

Myctophidae
Marine fish genera
Taxa named by Alec Fraser-Brunner